Reti or Réti may refer to:

Entertainment
 Reti, a character in the video game Star Wars: Starfighter
 Réti endgame study, a chess endgame study by Richard Réti
 Réti Opening, chess opening named after Richard Réti
 Reti (film), a 2016 Marathi movie

People
 István Réti (1872–1945), painter
 Richard Réti (1889–1929), chess master
 Rudolph Reti (1885–1957), musical analyst, composer and pianist

Places
 Reti, Estonia, village in Põdrala Parish, Valga County, Estonia
 Reti, Pakistan, a town in Pakistan
 Reti, Western Australia, aka Empress Springs, a tiny place on the Great Central Road

See also
 Reti, (Hindi for "sand"), in placenames like Muni Ki Reti
 Rhaetian people, an ancient confederation of Alpine tribes